Skin marking may refer to:

 Scarifying, scratching, etching, burning / branding, or cutting designs, pictures, or words into the skin as a permanent body modification.
 Hyperkeratosis, a skin condition
 Cutaneous condition, any of various skin conditions
 Mole (skin marking), a benign tumor on human skin, usually with darker pigment
 Tattoo
 Body art